The Age Book of the Year Awards were annual literary awards presented by Melbourne's The Age newspaper. The awards were first presented in 1974. After 1998, they were presented as part of the Melbourne Writers Festival. Initially, two awards were given, one for fiction (or imaginative writing), the other for non-fiction work, but in 1993, a poetry award in honour of Dinny O'Hearn was added. The criteria were that the works be "of outstanding literary merit and express Australian identity or character," and be published in the year before the award was made. One of the award-winners was chosen as The Age Book of the Year. The awards were discontinued in 2013. In 2021 The Age Book of the Year was revived as a fiction prize, with the winner announced at the Melbourne Writers Festival.

The Age Book of the Year

Fiction (or Imaginative Writing) Award

Non-fiction Award

Dinny O'Hearn Poetry Prize

First Book
2005: The Unknown Zone by Phil Smith

References

Australian fiction awards
Australian poetry awards
Awards established in 1974
1974 establishments in Australia
Awards disestablished in 2013
2013 disestablishments in Australia